Grapevine High School is a public high school located in the far northeast portion of Tarrant County in the  city of Grapevine, Texas (USA). It is part of the Grapevine-Colleyville Independent School District.

Its attendance boundary includes sections of Grapevine, Colleyville, Hurst, and Southlake.

In 2005, Grapevine was ranked #100 of the top 100 high schools in the United States of America by Newsweek magazine, and was named a 1999–2000 National Blue Ribbon School.

Students come from Cross Timbers Middle School, other portions of Colleyville Middle School and portion of Grapevine Middle School. Although Grapevine High School is in Grapevine, only half of the student body lives in Grapevine. The other half lives in Colleyville.

Campus
It has a coffeeshop.

Notable alumni

Camille Anderson, actress and TV host
Bryce Avary, musician
Richard Bartel, NFL player
Jack Brewer, NFL player
Bruce Channel, singer
Colt David, CFL football player
Jenna Dewan, actress
Chip Gaines, actor
Norah Jones, musician
Nick Leckey, NFL player
Demi Lovato, singer-songwriter and actress
Post Malone, musician
Henry Melton, NFL player
Ali Michael, model
Shea Salinas, MLS player
 Cody Spencer, NFL player

References

External links 

 

Grapevine, Texas
Grapevine-Colleyville Independent School District high schools
Educational institutions established in 1952
1952 establishments in Texas